The Roman Catholic Diocese of Zárate-Campana is a Latin rite suffragan diocese in the ecclesiastical province of the Archdiocese of Mercedes-Luján, in central Argentina on the Atlantic coast, having had change of metropolitan from La Plata in 2019.

Its cathedral episcopal see is Catedral Santa Florentina, dedicated to Saint Florentina, in Campana and it also has a co-cathedral: Cocatedral Natividad del Señor, dedicated to the Nativity of Our Lord, in Belén de Escobar, also in Buenos Aires Province.

History 
It was created by Pope Paul VI on 21 April 1976, by the Papal Bulla "Qui consilio divino" as Diocese of Zárate–Campana / Zaraten(sis)–Campanen(sis) (Latin adjective), on territories split off from the Diocese of San Isidro and from the Diocese of San Nicolás de los Arroyos. The first bishop, Claretian Mgr. Alfredo Mario Espósito Castro, chosen by Paul VI on 21 April 1976, received his episcopal consecration and took possession of the see on 4 July 1976.

Extent and statistics 
As per 2014, it pastorally served 660,000 Catholics (90.7% of 728,000 total) on 5,924 km² in 33 parishes and 89 missions with 88 priests (53 diocesan, 35 religious), 13 deacons, 178 lay religious (88 brothers, 90 sisters) and 27 seminarians.

It includes the cities of Campana (credited in its title), (Belén de) Escobar, Zarate, Baradero, Pilar, Exaltación de la Cruz and San Antonio de Areco, all in the northern part of Greater Buenos Aires.

Bishops

Episcopal ordinaries
 Alfredo Mario Espósito Castro, Claretians (C.M.F.) (1976.04.21 – resigned because of health reasons on 18 December 1991), died 2010 
 Rafael Eleuterio Rey (18 December 1991 (took see on 21 March 1992 – resigned because of health reasons 3 February 2006); previously Titular Bishop of Hilta (1983.04.30 – 1991.12.18) as Auxiliary Bishop of Archdiocese of Mendoza (Argentina) (1983.04.30 – 1991.12.18) 
 Oscar Domingo Sarlinga (3 February 2006 – retired 2015.11.03), previously Titular Bishop of Uzalis (2003.04.12 – 2006.02.03) as Auxiliary Bishop of Archdiocese of Mercedes–Luján (Argentina) (2003.04.12 – 2006.02.03)
 Pedro Maria Laxague (3 November 2015 – ...), previously Titular Bishop of Castra Severiana (2006.11.14 – 2015.11.03) as Auxiliary Bishop of Archdiocese of Bahía Blanca (Argentina) (2006.11.14 – 2015.11.03).

Auxiliary bishop
Justo Rodríguez Gallego (appointed 2020) (2021–

See also 
 List of Catholic dioceses in Argentina

References

Sources and external links 
 GCatholic, with Google map & satellite photo - data for all sections

Roman Catholic dioceses in Argentina
Roman Catholic Ecclesiastical Province of Mercedes-Luján
Religious organizations established in 1976
Roman Catholic dioceses and prelatures established in the 20th century
1976 establishments in Argentina
Roman Catholic bishops of Zárate-Campana